The following is a list of original programs of Óčko network.

Series 
 Single Lady

Other shows
 DJ divák
 Drive
 Hitrádio Desítka
 Inbox
 Mixxxer Extra
 Mixxxer Feed
 Mixxxer Live
 Limuzína
 Naked Attraction
 Ne***telní
 Noční chat
 Óčko Black List
 Óčko Black Spotify Czech List
 Óčko Chart
 Óčko hity
 Ranní fresh
 TOP 10
 YouTube Chart

References

Óčko